Ernst Sträussler (June 17, 1872, Ungarisch-Hradisch – July 11, 1959, Vienna) was an Austrian neuropathologist born in the Moravian city of Ungarisch-Hradisch.

In 1895 he earned his medical doctorate at the University of Vienna, and afterwards worked at the psychiatric clinic of Julius Wagner-Jauregg (1857–1940). In 1907 he was habilitated for psychiatry and neurology in Prague, where in 1915 he attained the title of professor extraordinary. In 1919 he returned to Vienna.

Sträussler is remembered for his work in forensic psychiatry, as well as his research involving the histopathology of the central nervous system. With neurologist Georg Koskinas (1885–1975) he performed important studies involving malaria inoculations as a type of therapy for progressive general paresis.

In 1936 with neurologists Josef Gerstmann (1887–1969) and Ilya Scheinker (1902–1954), he described a rare prion disease that is usually regarded as a variant of Creutzfeldt–Jakob disease. Today this condition is known as Gerstmann–Sträussler–Scheinker syndrome (GSS).

Bibliography 
 Anlage- und Bildungsfehler des Centralnervensystems, Anlagekrankheiten, Missbildungen, Heredodegeneration. Handbuch der Neurolologie des Ohres. Volume 2, 1. Berlin and Wien, 1928.

References 

Austrian neurologists
Austrian neuroscientists
Austrian psychiatrists
Austrian people of Moravian-German descent
People from Uherské Hradiště
1872 births
1959 deaths